LightDM is a free and open-source X display manager that aims to be lightweight, fast, extensible and multi-desktop. It can use various front-ends to draw the user interface, also called Greeters. It also supports Wayland.

LightDM is the default display manager for Edubuntu, Xubuntu and Mythbuntu since the 11.10 release, for Lubuntu since the 12.04 release until 16.10, for Kubuntu beginning with 12.10 until 15.04 for Linux Mint and Antergos.

Features 
Features include:
 Codebase with very few dependencies
 Supports different display technologies (X11 and Wayland through Mir)
 Supports remote login (incoming – XDMCP, VNC, outgoing – XDMCP, pluggable)
 Comprehensive test suite
 Standards-compliance (PAM, logind, etc.)
 Well-defined interface between the server and user interface
 Cross-desktop (greeters can be written in any toolkit)
 Well-defined greeter API allowing multiple GUIs
 Support for all display manager use cases, with plug-ins where appropriate

LightDM has a simpler code base than GDM and does not load any GNOME libraries to work, but at the cost of some features that the user may or may not need.

Available greeters

See also 

 SDDM
 SLiM
 XDM (display manager)
 GNOME Display Manager

References

External links 

 
 Bugs in Debian
 Bugs in Ubuntu

Canonical (company)
Ubuntu
Software that uses GTK
X display managers